Orbicella annularis, commonly known as the boulder star coral, is a species of coral that lives in the western Atlantic Ocean and is the most thoroughly studied and most abundant species of reef-building coral in the Caribbean to date. It also has a comprehensive fossil record within the Caribbean. This species complex has long been considered a generalist that exists at depths between 0 and 80 meters that grew into varying colony shapes (heads, columns, plates) in response to differing light conditions. Only recently with the help of molecular techniques has O. annularis been shown to be a complex of at least three separate species. Those species are divided into O. annularis, O. faveolata, and O. franksi. This coral was originally described as Montastraea annularis.

References

Further reading
 Lopez, J.V., Kersanach, R., Rehner, S.A., Knowlton, N. (1999) Molecular determination of species boundaries in corals: Genetic analysis of the Montastraea annularis complex using amplified fragment length polymorphisms and a microsatellite marker. Biol. Bull.  196:80-93.
 Fukami H, Budd AF, Levitan DR, Jara J, Kersanach R, Knowlton N. (2004) Geographic differences in species boundaries among members of the Montastraea annularis complex based on molecular and morphological markers. Evolution. 2004 Feb;58(2):324-37.

External links
 

Merulinidae
Coral reefs
Corals described in 1786
ESA threatened species